Neighbours: The Music is a soundtrack album to the Australian soap opera Neighbours. It was released in Australia, in 2002 on a dual disc CD and DVD set.

Background and release
"Neighbours: The Music" was released via Sony Records and features an audio CD with seventeen tracks, plus a DVD containing ten videos.

Track listing

References 

Television soundtracks
2002 soundtrack albums
Neighbours music